Port Charlotte  is a village on the island of Islay in the Inner Hebrides, Scotland. It was founded in 1828. In 1991 it had a population of 350.

Port Charlotte was named after Lady Charlotte Campbell Bury, the mother of its founder Walter Frederick Campbell; and it was set up mainly to provide housing facilities for the Lochindaal Distillery work force. Parts of the former distillery buildings are now in use as Youth Hostel and Wildlife Centre. Others are currently used by a garage nearby. The remaining warehouses are currently owned and used by Bruichladdich distillery to mature their Port Charlotte heavily peated spirit, named in tribute to the village and original distillery.

The village is located on the shores of Loch Indaal and is very picturesque with its white-painted houses.  It is home to the Museum of Islay Life which is located in a former Church building.

In October 1813, the American privateer The True Blooded Yankee captured six merchant ships lying at Port Charlotte, casting them adrift and setting fire to three.

See also
Port Charlotte distillery

References

External links
Canmore - Islay, Port Charlotte site record

Villages in Islay
Populated places established in 1828